During the 2015-16 season, the Manchester Phoenix participated in the semi-professional English Premier Ice Hockey League.

It was announced during the off-season that the Phoenix would be playing out of Flintshire at the Deeside Ice Rink, for the 2015-2016 season, until a permanent new arena in Manchester is completed. Phoenix owner, Neil Morris, confirmed that ticket holders will be able to travel free for free to Deeside, with pick-up points spread around the city of Manchester. He said "The trip to Deeside takes just over 30 minutes, which will give fans the chance to mingle, make friends and strengthen the famous Phoenix faithful."

Ticketing
SEASON TICKETS

SINGLE GAME TICKETS

Children get free entry when accompanied by an adult, unaccompanied children can purchase tickets on the door for £5.

Standings

English Premier League

[**] EPIHL League Champions. [*] Secured play-off berth

Schedule and results

Preseason
Phoenix started their pre-season with a 3-3 draw away to Swindon Wildcats, before defeating the same opponent, 6-3, the following night. They then faced the Telford Tigers in a two-legged battle for the Red Hockey Cup. The Phoenix secured a narrow road to victory before suffering a heavy defeat on home ice which resulted in the Tigers winning 12-7 on aggregate.

Regular season
Stanislav Gron scored his and the Phoenix' second goal of the game against the Swindon Wildcats on Saturday 21 November 2015, however the goal was inexplicably awarded to Michal Satek.

Play-Offs

References

External links 
 Manchester Phoenix Official Website

Manchester Phoenix seasons